Hersbruck is a small town in Middle Franconia, Bavaria, Germany, belonging to the district Nürnberger Land. It is best known for the late-gothic artwork of the Hersbruck altar, the "Hirtenmuseum" and the landscape of Hersbruck Switzerland.

History
Hersbruck was founded in 976 when a castle was built there near a bridge. The name probably comes from Haderihesprucga, the bridge of Haderich.

In the Middle Ages the town was situated on the Golden Route from Nuremberg to Prague, which brought prosperity to Hersbruck. In 1297 Hersbruck was given municipal rights, after 1504 the town belonged to the area of the free imperial town Nuremberg and in 1806 became Bavarian. Hersbruck was the birthplace, in 1673, of Jacob Paul von Gundling, the famous and unfortunate historian at the court of Brandenburg-Prussia.

During the Nazi regime, Hersbruck contained a subsidiary camp of Flossenbürg concentration camp. The camp had about 10,000 prisoners, about 4,000 of them died in Hersbruck.

After World War II, that camp, on the outskirts of town, was converted for housing Latvian Displaced Persons and renamed as Camp Kathann.  It was first operated by United Nations Relief and Rehabilitation Administration and later by International Refugee Organization.

Today, the whole area where the camp used to be has been completely redeveloped. In 2007 the monument Ohne Namen (Without names) by Vittore Bocchetta has been erected in the Rosengarten close to the camp site. The artist, one of the Italian political deportees, had managed to escape in April 1945 during one of the death marches from Hersbruck to Dachau, when the camp was evacuated by the Nazis with the approach of U.S. forces.

Suburbs
 Altensittenbach
 Kühnhofen
 Ellenbach
 Weiher
 Leutenbach
 Großviehberg

Partner community
  Lossiemouth (Moray, UK), since 1972.
  Pavia, (Italy), since 2005.
  San Daniele, Italy, since 2008

Culture
In Hersbruck the Deutsches Hirtenmuseum, the only museum in Germany which shows the working and living conditions of herdsmen.

Recreation
In 2004 the Frankenalb-Therme (http://www.frankenalbtherme.de) was opened. It offers apart from a thermal and a fun bath area with a slide (length 82 m) also a large sauna area including several outdoor saunas.

Notable people 
 Nikolaus Selnecker (1530−1592), German musician and theologian
 Günther Beckstein (born 1943), German politician
 Melanie Skotnik (born 1982), French-German high jumper

References

External links

 http://www.hersbruck.de/ – official homepage of the City of Hersbruck
 http://www.frankenalbtherme.de/ – fun- and thermal bath Frankenalb-Therme Hersbruck
 http://www.kz-hersbruck-info.de/ – webpage of the documentation site concentration camp Hersbruck e. V

976 establishments
Nürnberger Land
10th-century establishments in Germany